Jean-Baptiste Luton Durival (4 July 1725 – 14 February 1810) was an 18th-century French historian, diplomat and Encyclopédiste.

Life 
His father was Jacques Durival, Officier de la garde robe de Son Altesse royale (S.A.R.), married since 29 October 1712 to Anne Humblot, his mother. Overall, the family consisted of three sons, Nicolas-Luton Durival the elder one, then Jean-Baptiste Luton and Claude Durival (1728–1805) and two daughters Catherine and Marie Anne Durival.

While his elder brother was secrétaire des conseils d’État et des finances under Stanisław Leszczyński, Jean-Baptiste took the post of first secretary of Foreign Affairs, premier secrétaire des affaires étrangères, under the Duke Étienne-François de Choiseul and led a diplomatic career.

In 1777, he was summoned to the Dutch Republic as Minister of France. He was married to Louise Élisabeth Dufrène (1738–1819).

Luton-Durival wrote several articles related to the Art militaire for the Encyclopédie. He was a member of the Académie de Stanislas.

Works (selection) 
 Essai sur l’Infanterie française. (1760)
 Détails militaires. (1758) 
 Le Point d’honneur
 Histoire du règne de Philippe, translated with Mirabeau from Watson. Amsterdam, (1777)
 Description de la Lorraine et du Barrois.
 Recueil des observations météorologiques.

References

External links 
 Jean-Baptiste Luton Durival on data.bnf.fr
 ARTFL Encyclopédie Project - Robert Morrissey, General Editor; Glenn Roe, Assoc. Editor
 List of his articles for the Encyclopédie on Wikisource

English–French translators
18th-century French historians
18th-century French diplomats
Contributors to the Encyclopédie (1751–1772)
People from Lorraine
1725 births
1810 deaths
18th-century French translators